Kissada Nilsawai (born 14 April 1992) is a Thai volleyball player who is currently the captain of the Thailand men's national volleyball team. He is of Malian descent and is the first volleyball player of African ancestry to represent Thailand at international level.

Clubs 
  Chonburi (2011–2016)
  Air Force (2016–2019)
  Diamond Food (2020–present)

Awards

Individual
 2017 Thai-Denmark Super League "Best Server"
 2018 Thai-Denmark Super League "Best Blocker"

Clubs 
 2010-11 Thailand League -  Champion, with Chonburi
 2011-12 Thailand League -  Champion, with Chonburi
 2012-13 Thailand League -  Bronze Medal, with Chonburi
 2013-14 Thailand League -  Runner-up, with Chonburi
 2014 Thai–Denmark Super League -  Champion, with Chonburi
 2015 Thai–Denmark Super League -  Champion, with Chonburi
 2015–16 Thailand League -  Bronze Medal, with Chonburi E-Tech Air Force
 2016–17 Thailand League -  Champion, with Air Force
 2017 Thai–Denmark Super League -  Runner-up, with Air Force
 2017–18 Thailand League -  Champion, with Air Force
 2018 Thai–Denmark Super League -  Champion, with Air Force
 2017–18 Thailand League -  Champion, with Air Force
 2019 Thai–Denmark Super League -  Runner-Up, with Air Force

Royal decoration 
 2015 -  Silver Medalist (Seventh Class) of The Most Admirable Order of the Direkgunabhorn

References

Living people
Kissada Nilsawai
Kissada Nilsawai
Kissada Nilsawai
Kissada Nilsawai
Southeast Asian Games medalists in volleyball
South China AA volleyball players
Competitors at the 2011 Southeast Asian Games
Competitors at the 2013 Southeast Asian Games
Competitors at the 2015 Southeast Asian Games
Competitors at the 2017 Southeast Asian Games
1992 births
Volleyball players at the 2018 Asian Games
Competitors at the 2019 Southeast Asian Games
Kissada Nilsawai
Middle blockers
Kissada Nilsawai
Competitors at the 2021 Southeast Asian Games